Atherix marginata, the black-legged water-snipefly, is a species of ibis flies belonging to the family Athericidae, a small family very similar to the Rhagionidae (snipe flies).

Distribution
This species is present in most of Europe (Albania, Austria, Belgium, Bosnia and Herzegovina, British Islands, Bulgaria, Croatia, Czech Republic, Denmark, France, Germany, Hungary, Ireland, Italy, Poland, Portugal, Romania, Slovakia, Spain, Switzerland and The Netherlands).

Description
The body is quite slender, eyes are rounded and well separated, antennae are trisegmented, costae are extended around the whole wings, and the abdomen has several dark and clear stripes. The legs are entirely black (hence the common name).

Biology
Adults can be found from May to Augusty. Adult females gather in large clumps and lay egg masses on tree branches or under  bridges over flowing waters. In such a way, the first-stage larvae will fall into the water, where they start their lives. The larvae are aquatic and saprophagous. They show 6-8 abdominal segments.

Habitat
These ibis flies are usually found alongside shallow rivers and streams, especially in hilly areas., where the larvae develop as predators.

References

Further reading
 Stubbs, A. and Drake, M - British Soldierflies and Their Allies: A Field Guide to the Larger British Brachycera, pp. 512 - British Entomological and Natural History Society 
 A. Minelli – La fauna in Italia – Touring Editore
 Di Paul S. Giller, Björn Malmqvist - The biology of streams and rivers'' – Oxford University Press

External links

 Bug Guide

Athericidae
Insects described in 1798
Diptera of Europe
Taxa named by Johan Christian Fabricius